Abiquiu Lake is a reservoir located in Rio Arriba County, in northern New Mexico in the southwestern United States.

The shoreline area near the dam is a recreation area managed by the US Army Corps of Engineers (USACE). Available activities include camping, picnicking, hiking, swimming, boating, and fishing.

References

External links
 Corps of Engineers website
 

Lakes of Rio Arriba County, New Mexico
Reservoirs in New Mexico
Protected areas of Rio Arriba County, New Mexico
Buildings and structures in Rio Arriba County, New Mexico